Baskerville is a typeface.

Baskerville may also refer to:

 Ralph de Baskerville, son of Robert de Basqueville who held Eardisley Castle 
 Howard Baskerville (1885–1909), American teacher in the Presbyterian mission school in Tabriz, Iran, who died fighting for Iranian democracy
 John Baskerville, eighteenth-century English printer and typeface designer
 Baskerville, Virginia, a census-designated place in Mecklenburg County, Virginia, United States
 Baskerville, Western Australia
 Baskerville House, a building in Birmingham, England
 Baskerville Raceway, a motor racing circuit near Hobart, Australia
 Baskerville, a fictional dog in the gamebook The Curse of Batterslea Hall
 The Hound of the Baskervilles, the third of four crime novels by Sir Arthur Conan Doyle featuring the detective Sherlock Holmes
 "The Hounds of Baskerville", an episode of the TV series Sherlock inspired by the Doyle novel
 William of Baskerville, the main character of the novel The Name of the Rose

See also
 Baskerville (surname)
 The Hound of the Baskervilles (disambiguation)